The SGH-E700 was a mobile phone designed by Samsung Group. It was announced by Samsung in 2003, and has been discontinued.
During its production time more than 10 million units were sold.

References 

Samsung mobile phones
Mobile phones introduced in 2003
Mobile phones with infrared transmitter